The Men's singles race of the 2016 FIL World Luge Championships was held on 31 January 2016.

Results
The first run will be started at 10:19 and the final run at 12:27.

References

Men's singles